Burca is a genus of skipper butterflies in the family Hesperiidae. The genus was erected by Ernest Layton Bell and William Phillips Comstock in 1948.

Species
Burca braco (Herrich-Schäffer, 1865)
Burca concolor (Herrich-Schäffer, 1865)
Burca cubensis (Skinner, 1913)
Burca hispaniolae Bell & Comstock, 1948
Burca stillmanni Bell & Comstock, 1948

References

Carcharodini
Hesperiidae genera